= Radojčići =

- Village
- Location within Bosnia and Herzegovina
- Coordinates: 44.2329462°N 17.734652°E
- Country: Bosnia and Herzegovina
- Entity: Federation of Bosnia and Herzegovina
- Canton: Central Bosnia
- Municipality: Travnik

Area
  - Total: 0.47 sq mi (1.23 km^{2})

Population (2013)
  - Total: 312
  - Density: 657/sq mi (254/km^{2})
- Time zone: UTC+1 (CET)
  - Summer (DST): UTC+2 (CEST)

Radojčići is a village in the municipality of Travnik, Bosnia and Herzegovina.

== Demographics ==
According to the 2013 census, its population was 312.

Ethnicity in 2013
Ethnicity	Number	Percentage
Bosniaks	309	99.0%
other/undeclared	3	1.0%
Total	312	100%
